The Fascinating Widow is a 1910 musical comedy written by Otto Hauerbach as a vehicle for the female impersonator Julian Eltinge. The play premiered in Atlantic City, New Jersey, then toured the United States for 10 months before appearing on Broadway in September 1911.

Productions
The play premiered at the Apollo Theatre in Atlantic City, New Jersey on November 14, 1910, with A.H. Woods producing. Woods toured the show around the United States, then brought it back to the Apollo in August 1911, before taking it to Broadway. It opened on Broadway at the Liberty Theatre on September 11, 1911. After a seven-week run on Broadway, the show returned to the road, where it ran for several more years.

Cast and characters

The characters and cast from the Broadway production are given below:

Adaptations
The play was adapted as a silent film in 1925.

References

External links

 

1910 plays
Broadway musicals
Comedy plays
English-language plays
American plays adapted into films
Musicals by Otto Harbach
Culture of Atlantic City, New Jersey